Reykjavik to Rotterdam (2007) was a festival first organized by the Reykjavik To Foundation. The main venue was Lantaren/Venster. The second venue was Waterfront. 12 Tónar set up their shop as well.

Performances 
 Mr. Silla & Mongoose
 Hafdís Huld
 Rass
 Apparat Organ Quartet
 Seabear
 Lost in Hildurness
 Reykjavik!
 Mammút
 Ghostigital
 Evil Madness
 Rökkurró
 Múm

Movies 
 Heima - a film by Sigur Rós
 Man on my back
 Family reunion
 Another
 Thanks for helping
 Lost my head
 Hidebound
 Farmer John's world
 Anna and the moods
 Midnight

External links 
 https://archive.today/20071011073421/http://reykjavik.to/rotterdam/
 https://www.flickr.com/photos/reykjavik_to/

Icelandic music
Music festivals in the Netherlands
2007 festivals